Breedlove is an English occupational surname likely derived from Old English "bridel" (pronounced "breedel"), meaning to catch or curb, and Anglo-Norman "louve" or wolf. Etymologically related surnames include Catchlove, Pretlove, and Truslove. An alternate derivation is a combination of Middle English "brede" (breed or produce) and "loue" (love). 

Notable people bearing it include:
 Beau Breedlove, Oregon legislative intern involved with Portland mayor Sam Adams
 Ben Breedlove (1993–2011), American video blogger
 Breedlove quadruplets, first set of identical, natural quadruplets born in Houston (2005)
 Charles Winchester Breedlove (1898–1934), American actor, director, and politician
 Craig Breedlove (born 1937), American engineer and driver
 Dennis Eugene Breedlove (1939–2012), American botanist, ethnobotanist, and plant collector
 Gina Breedlove, American singer, songwriter, and actress
 Hugh Breedlove Millen (born 1963), American professional football player
 James M. Breedlove  (1922–2016), U.S. Air Force Major General
 Lynn Breedlove (born 1956), American musician
 Marc Breedlove (born 1954), American neuroscientist
 Philip M. Breedlove (born 1955), U.S. Air Force four-star general
 Rod Breedlove (1938–2021), American football linebacker
 Sarah Breedlove (1867-1919), African-American entrepreneur, philanthropist, and activist; also known as Madame C.J. Walker
 Seth Breedlove (born 1981/1982), American filmmaker
 Steve Breedlove (born 1950), American Anglican bishop

See also

Places 
Breedlove, former name of Silver Lake, West Virginia
 Breedlove House and Water Tower, historic property in Bentonville, Arkansas
 Breedlove Island, located in Big Skin Bayou, near Lee's Chapel, Arkansas
 Breedlove Knob, located in the Virginia Blue Ridge Mountains
 Breedlove Mill, located on the Joseph P. Hunt Farm in Granville County, North Carolina
 Mims-Breedlove-Priest-Weatherton House, historic home in Little Rock, Arkansas
 Simpson-Breedlove House, historic home in Union Township, Indiana

Other 
 The Dreams of Sarah Breedlove, 2005 play by Regina Taylor
 Melungeon DNA Project, 2005 genetic study of Breedlove and other selected surnames in Hancock County, Tennessee
 Breedlove Odyssey, 2005 concert tour featuring Mos Def, Talib Kweli, Pharoahe Monch, K'naan, and others
 Breedlove v. Nicolet, 1833 U.S. Supreme Court case
 Parsons v. Breedlove, 1830 U.S. Supreme Court case
 Lophospermum breedlovei, Mexican perennial plant named for botanist Dennis E. Breedlove
 Breedlove AMX, limited edition model sold by American Motors Corporation in 1968-1969; the 1969 AMC Javelin also included a "Craig Breedlove roof-mounted spoiler" option

References

